Llanfrynach is a village and community in the county of Powys, Wales, and the historic county of Brecknockshire. The population of the community as taken at the 2011 census was 571. It lies just to the southeast of Brecon in the Brecon Beacons National Park.  The village sits astride the Nant Menasgin, a right bank tributary of the River Usk. The B4558 passes just to its north and the Monmouthshire and Brecon Canal also passes around the village. The Welsh name signifies the 'church of Brynach'. The community includes the hamlets of Llanhamlach and Groesffordd.

The Cefn Brynich Canal Bridge Aqueduct over the Usk is a Grade II* listed structure.

The community is included in the Talybont-on-Usk electoral ward, which chooses one county councillor for Powys County Council.

References

External links
 images of Llanfrynach and surrounding area on Geograph website

Fforest Fawr
Villages in Powys